Pedro de Calatayud (1 August 1689 in Navarre, Spain – 27 February 1773 in Bologna, Papal States) was a Jesuit missionary.

References

1689 births
1773 deaths
People from Navarre
18th-century Spanish Jesuits
Spanish Roman Catholic missionaries